Qeytul (also Romanized as Qeyţūl) is a village in Cham Chamal Rural District, Bisotun District, Harsin County, Kermanshah Province, Iran. At the 2006 census, its population was 172, in 37 families.

References 

Populated places in Harsin County